Luis Caballero is a comedian and writer of Puerto Rican descent, who lived in New York City for most of his life.  After performing stand-up in comedy clubs for several years, he teamed up with filmmaker Ben Model to adapt his comedy material into a film.  That film, which Model produced and directed, became The Puerto Rican Mambo (Not a Musical), a 74-minute feature which was released theatrically in 1992 and on home video in 1996.  Caballero's sardonic humor sought to shed light on the Puerto Rican experience.

References

Living people
Place of birth missing (living people)
Year of birth missing (living people)
American male comedians
21st-century American comedians